Kimberly Kempf-Leonard is an American criminologist served as the dean of the University of Louisville's College of Arts and Sciences from 2014 to 2020.

Career 
Previously, she was the dean of Southern Illinois University-Carbondale's College of Liberal Arts from 2011 to 2014. She has also was on the faculty at the University of Texas-Dallas, the University of Missouri-St. Louis, and Kent State University.
Her research advanced measurement and our understanding of disparities in criminal and juvenile justice processing by race, ethnicity, gender, and location. She also examined crime specialization, desistance, escalation, and onset using the 1958 Philadelphia Birth Cohort.

References

External links
Faculty page
Kempf-Leonard named Liberal Arts dean, Southern Illinois University-Carbondale News (June 13, 2011)

Living people
American criminologists
University of Louisville faculty
Southern Illinois University Carbondale faculty
University of Nebraska alumni
Pennsylvania State University alumni
University of Pennsylvania alumni
American women social scientists
American women criminologists
Year of birth missing (living people)
American women academics
21st-century American women